The Bloodhound Gang was an American rap rock band from Collegeville, Pennsylvania. It was founded in 1988 by rappers Jimmy Pop and Daddy Long Legs (now in Wolfpac) as a hip-hop group, before branching out into other genres as their career progressed, including punk rock, alternative hip hop, rapcore, funk metal, and electronic rock.

Having sold more than 6 million albums since its formation, the band is best known for their singles "Fire Water Burn", "The Bad Touch", "Foxtrot Uniform Charlie Kilo", "Uhn Tiss Uhn Tiss Uhn Tiss", "The Ballad of Chasey Lain", and a hard rock version of The Association's 1966 sunshine pop hit "Along Comes Mary".

History

Formation and early days (1988–1995)
The Bloodhound Gang began in 1988 as a small alternative band, Bang Chamber 8, consisting of James Moyer Franks and Michael Bowe, both graduates of Perkiomen Valley High School. They released an eponymous tape in 1990 before changing their name to the Bloodhound Gang the following year, a reference to "The Bloodhound Gang", a segment on the 1980s PBS kids' show 3-2-1 Contact that featured three young detectives solving mysteries and fighting crime. Franks and Bowe also took on the stage names "Jimmy Pop Ali" (the "Ali" was later dropped) and "Daddy Long Legs", respectively.

Unable to book shows anywhere else, the Bloodhound Gang first performed in an extra room at the home of future bassist and Jimmy Pop's Temple University classmate Jared Hennegan's house, in exchange for Schlitz beer, Marlboro cigarettes, and a chance to hand out their first demo tape, titled Just Another Demo. When the floor caved in one night, they began performing every month at CBGBs in New York City. When asked about the band's tenure at the club, Jimmy Pop was quoted as saying, "I've seen cavemen with better clubs."

In April 1994, the band released their second demo tape, The Original Motion Picture Soundtrack to Hitler's Handicapped Helpers. This resulted in a record deal with Cheese Factory Records.

In summer 1994, Jimmy Pop had a small role in the short independent film The Chick That Was Naked by independent filmmaker Kurt Fitzpatrick; a song by the band was also used on its soundtrack.

In November 1994, the Bloodhound Gang released their first EP, Dingleberry Haze.

Use Your Fingers (1995)
In March 1995, the Bloodhound Gang signed a record deal with Columbia Records. They released their first full-length album, titled Use Your Fingers. They began touring around the United States. At this time, Daddy Long Legs and M.S.G. (Matthew Clarke), who were angry with Columbia Records, left the band to form another rap group, Wolfpac. Bass player Hennegan and turntablist Tard-E-Tard joined the group as replacements, with Hennegan taking on the stage name "Evil Jared Hasselhoff". When the tour ended, the deal with Columbia Records was dropped and band members Skip O'Pot2Mus (Scott Richard) and Tard-E-Tard left to pursue careers outside of the music industry.

One Fierce Beer Coaster (1996–1997)
In March 1996, the band, which had a completely new line-up alongside Jimmy Pop, recorded their second full-length album, One Fierce Beer Coaster, with Richard Gavalis, a producer and owner of Dome Sound Studios, in Royersford, Pennsylvania, local to Jimmy Pop. Lupus Thunder had recorded with Gavalis at the Dome with a former band, and introduced Jimmy Pop to Gavalis, who had the first studio in the area to embrace computer recording and could edit live instruments in ways other studios could not. This led to a relationship that followed through to the band's next albums. One Fierce Beer Coaster was first released on Cheese Factory Records (now Republic Records).

The album's leading single, "Fire Water Burn", played a major role in the slow build of interest that ultimately led to the band's mainstream breakthrough. As the band could not previously afford national tours, they promoted themselves by sending their music to radio stations across the country that fit the alternative rock format. One significant early radio breakthrough came when an intern at 107.7 The End in Seattle brought the band to the attention of the music director, who, liking what he heard, played "Fire Water Burn" on his Friday night show. The feature prompted a flood of phone calls asking about the song and the band. The director passed the song on to his friend, the music director at KROQ-FM in Los Angeles, who then added it to her playlist. The snowball effect meant the band was overwhelmed with demands for their records, which they struggled to meet. Record labels then started to call. According to manager Brett Alperowitz in an interview with HitQuarters, Madonna's label Maverick "really wanted to sign the band in the worst possible way, even to the point where I had to tell Madonna that I couldn't put her on the phone with Jimmy Pop." Eventually, the Bloodhound Gang signed with Geffen Records, which re-released One Fierce Beer Coaster in December 1996. They also embarked on their first "real tour" of the United States and Europe, including presentations on Loveline, The Howard Stern Show, Ricki Lake, and The Jenny McCarthy Show. After a couple of years of doing shows, taking advantage of the Internet, spreading the word through retail and radio in every way that the band and management could on an independent level, they began to experience major success.

Hooray for Boobies (1998–2000)
On October 4, 1999, they released their third album, Hooray for Boobies, in Europe; due to legal issues, the US release was delayed until February 29, 2000. This album was recorded in California, where the band and their engineer Rich Gavalis relocated. The album was recorded partially at a Los Angeles studio the band rented, and partially at Gavalis' home in the Valley. Powered by the hit single "The Bad Touch", they embarked on two more tours of Europe, where their popularity had increased dramatically ("The Bad Touch" and Hooray for Boobies reached No. 1 in Germany, where their version of "Along Comes Mary" was also a top 10 hit). They returned after selling over five million albums.

In 2003, the band released a DVD, One Fierce Beer Run, which chronicled their 1997 One Fierce Beer Coaster tour.

Hefty Fine (2004–2007)

The band's fourth album Hefty Fine was released on September 13, 2005. The title came about after Evil Jared Hasselhoff was fined during work on MTV's Viva La Bam (the "Scavenger Hunt" episode). Jared was fined $10,000, which Jimmy Pop allegedly had to pay (as discussed in the "un-commentary" of the Viva La Bam DVD release). Jimmy has stated that Jared was arrested after attempting to urinate from the top of a parking lot into a Dixie cup that he (Jimmy) was holding. The CD's original title, Heavy Flow, was scrapped when it was noticed fellow musician Moby had a song with the same name. The first single, "Foxtrot Uniform Charlie Kilo", gained heavy rotation on music video channels. Although the track "No Hard Feelings" had recently broken into the Modern Rock Top 50, their second single "Uhn Tiss Uhn Tiss Uhn Tiss" (which is featured in a Blaupunkt, a BGL Grand Wizard ad), had started radio circulation, with a music video airing limitedly on a few music channels. Other songs from the album were part of a campaign by the Bloodhound Gang to change the Pennsylvania state anthem to their appropriately-titled "Pennsylvania", as well as "Something Diabolical", featuring HIM's Ville Valo.

In 2007, the band recorded a single, "Screwing You on the Beach at Night", accompanied by a video based on the one for Chris Isaak's song "Wicked Game".

Hard-Off and questionable future (2008–2020)
In October 2008, Lupus Thunder quit the band. The band said he had decided to never again tour with them. Lupus had earlier confessed to being the complainer of the group and arguing with the other members while vowing not to leave the band. Daniel P. Carter from British alternative rock band A was confirmed as the new lead guitarist. Carter has since played gigs such as the Australian Soundwave Festival with the band. Jimmy Pop announced during a radio interview in Boston that the band was working on a new album, featuring around 10 to 12 songs. Many media outlets reported that the name of the album would be Getting Laid on a School Bus with a release date of 2012. On December 4, 2011, Jimmy Pop announced that he "just narrowed 25-30 demos down to 10-12 to finish".

In late 2010, the band released a new song, "Altogether Ooky". On November 15, DJ Q-Ball mentioned on his Facebook page that the band was going to Berlin to shoot a music video for the song, which would also be included on a greatest hits compilation album. The greatest hits album, Show Us Your Hits, was released on December 21, featuring new songs "Altogether Ooky" and an English version of Die Atzen's "Disco Pogo", alongside the older hits. In an interview in 2011, Evil Jared stated that the new album would be released in either 2012 or 2013. Q-Ball also mentioned on Twitter that signs pointed to either late 2012 or early 2013 as for the release, and that the album was "moving along very nicely", as well as claiming that it was their best album to date. A second music video was also released for "Screwing You on the Beach at Night", featuring the band playing in a small room while porn stars Till Kraemer and Leonie Saint have sex in the center of the room. At the end of the video, Kraemer ejaculates in Jimmy Pop's hand, after which he rubs the semen through his hair. That video had been filmed in 2007, but was not released until 2010.

In February 2014, Jimmy Pop wrote on Twitter that he was recording vocals every day for the album. On August 8, a new single entitled "Chew Toy" was announced, along with a pre-order of the vinyl with a release date of August 19. The song was uploaded to YouTube later that day. "American Bitches" was released on the band's YouTube account October 20, with a vinyl release date of late December 2014. "Dimes" was released on February 24. "Clean Up in Aisle Sexy" was released May 12, along with remixes by Mike Emilio, M.I.K.E. Push, and Psyko Punkz. In September 2015, a fifth single from the album, the new wave-inspired "Uncool as Me", featuring Joey Fatone, was released. Pre-orders for the album began in October 2015, with a release window of early December. The album, Hard-Off, was released on December 18, 2015.

In July 2016, MVD Audio reissued Hooray for Boobies on blue vinyl; One Fierce Beer Coaster followed on yellow vinyl that September. Both releases were limited to 1,500 copies.

In an interview with the German site KinKats on March 4, 2017, Hasselhoff joked that the Bloodhound Gang would only reform and tour if Donald Trump was impeached. In an interview with the German site Promiflash at the end of 2017, however, he clarified that the band had broken up in 2013 after the Ukraine and Russia incidents, expressing his regrets for his actions. When asked in the same interview about the current status of the group, he stated that he was unsure if they still existed, but added that he would still be considered a member.

On March 27, 2020, a 20th anniversary vinyl reissue of Hooray for Boobies, including remixes, was released.

Controversies

"Yellow Fever" and anti-East Asian allegations
Geffen Records refused to release the song "Yellow Fever" because of its graphic lyrical content about East Asian women, including lyrics like "Like an Oriental rug, 'cause I lay her where I please, then I blindfold her with dental floss and get on my knees" and "Oh me Chinky, she's so kinky, got me hot like Nagasaki, burnin' up like napalm, burstin' like an A-bomb."

Onstage antics
The band caused controversy in 2006 when they started using a "golden shower" act onstage during a rendition of Depeche Mode's "Enjoy the Silence" at Rock am Ring and Pinkpop.

On July 30, 2013, during a concert in Kyiv, Ukraine, band member Jared Hasselhoff was seen urinating on the flag of Ukraine while on stage. The incident drew outrage from local politicians, and the band faced criminal charges of hooliganism. Days later, after an onstage stunt involving the flag of Russia in Odessa, where Hasselhoff stuffed the flag down the front of his pants and pulled it out of the back in addition to shouting at the crowd to “Don’t tell Putin”, the band's show in Anapa, Russia was cancelled, and the band members were assaulted at the airport, including being pelted with eggs and rotten tomatoes. A flag of the United States was also trampled and spat on.

Vladimir Markin of the Investigative Committee of Russia said that his department was prepared to file criminal charges if prosecutors thought they had a case. Although Jared Hasselhoff apologized in public for the profanation of a state symbol of Russia, the band was forced to cancel their Russian stay immediately, and their visas were summarily cancelled. On August 3, 2013, they left Russia via Sheremetyevo International Airport.

Awards and nominations

Members

Musicians

Final lineup
 Jimmy Pop (James Franks) – lead vocals, rhythm guitar, occasional keyboards (1988–2015); lead guitar (1988–1994)
 Daniel P. Carter – lead guitar, backing vocals (2009–2015)
 Evil Jared Hasselhoff (Jared Hennegan) – bass, backing vocals (1995–2015)
 The Yin (Adam Perry) – drums, backing vocals (2006–2015)
 DJ Q-Ball (Harry Dean Jr.) – keyboards, synthesizer, turntables, programming, samples, hype man, backing vocals (1995–2015)

Former members
 Daddy Long Legs (Michael Bowe) – lead vocals, bass (1988–1995)
 Bubba K. Love (Kyle Seifert) – turntables, backing vocals (1992–1993)
 Foof (Jack Vandergrift) – drums, backing vocals (1992)
 Lazy I – backing vocals (1992)
 White Steve – backing vocals (1992)
 Skip O'Pot2Mus (Scott Richard) – drums, backing vocals (1992–1995)
 M.S.G. (Matthew Clarke) – turntables, backing vocals (1994–1995)
 Lupus Thunder (Matthew Stigliano) – lead guitar, backing vocals, turntables  (1994–2008)
 Tard-E-Tard – turntables (1995)
 Spanky G (Michael Guthier) – drums (1995–1999)
 Willie The New Guy (Billy Brehony) – drums (1999–2006)

Timeline

Discography

Studio albums
Use Your Fingers (1995)
One Fierce Beer Coaster (1996)
Hooray for Boobies (1999)
Hefty Fine (2005)
Hard-Off (2015)

See also

One Fierce Beer Run, a DVD with behind-the-scenes footage from the One Fierce Beer Coaster tour

References

External links

 
Musical groups established in 1988
Musical groups disestablished in 2015
Musical groups from Philadelphia
Rapcore groups
Columbia Records artists
Geffen Records artists
Alternative rock groups from Pennsylvania
American comedy musical groups
Comedy rock musical groups
American electronic rock musical groups
Rap rock groups
1988 establishments in Pennsylvania
2015 disestablishments in Pennsylvania
Obscenity controversies in music